The Seko languages are a group of four closely related Austronesian languages spoken in West Sulawesi and South Sulawesi provinces, Indonesia. They make up a primary branch of the South Sulawesi subgroup. The languages of the Seko branch are: Seko Padang, Seko Tengah, Panasuan and Budong-Budong.

The Badaic languages (namely Bada, Besoa, and Napu) are classified by Zobel (2020) with the Seko languages as part of a Seko–Badaic group within the South Sulawesi branch.

References

Languages of Sulawesi
South Sulawesi languages